Simbarashe Chinani (born 16 September 1995) is a Zimbabwean football goalkeeper who currently plays for Dynamos.

References

1995 births
Living people
Zimbabwean footballers
Yadah Stars F.C. players
Dynamos F.C. players
Zimbabwe international footballers
Association football goalkeepers
Zimbabwe Premier Soccer League players
Zimbabwe A' international footballers
2020 African Nations Championship players